Kiraak is a 2014 Indian Telugu-language romantic thriller directed by Harik Devabhaktuni. The film stars newcomer Anirudh and Chandini. The film's title is based on a song from Attarintiki Daredi (2013). The film was a box office failure.

Cast 
Anirudh as Rakesh, a Pawan Kalyan fan
Chandini as Amruta, Rakesh's collegemate and a Mahesh Babu fan
Posani Krishna Murali as a tantrik
Vennela Kishore

Release
A critic from The Hindu opined that "Director Haarik Devabhaktuni sets out to make a horror film with a message, but it starts off as any romantic movie would before bringing in a few sequences that are supposed to be horror but can best be described as lame, before the plot takes another twist altogether". A critic from 123 Telugu gave a rating of 2 out of 5 and said "Lackluster screenplay, old story line and slow pace are some of the basic letdowns. Except for the decent performance of the lead pair, this film has nothing much to offer". Hemanth Kumar of The Times of India gave a rating of 1.5/5 and said "It is one thing to have so called ‘noble’ intentions to make a film which throws light on a social issue, but that’s no excuse when the filmmaker is clueless about what he’s trying to say in the garb of entertainment. And the film’s script is as terrible as it gets".

References